William Edward Hilly (February 22, 1887 – July 25, 1953) was a Major League Baseball right fielder who played for the Philadelphia Phillies in . Hilly's actual last name was Hilgerink.

External links 

1887 births
1953 deaths
Philadelphia Phillies players
Major League Baseball right fielders
Baseball players from Ohio
Dayton Flyers baseball players
Keokuk Indians players
People from Fostoria, Ohio